Manuel Herz is an architect with his own practice in Basel, Switzerland and Cologne, Germany.

He was educated at the RWTH Aachen in Germany and at the Architectural Association in London. He has received numerous prizes and awards, published widely on Jewish architecture in Germany and has taught at the Bartlett School of Architecture in London and KTH Stockholm.

He was the head of research and teaching at ETH Studio Basel: Contemporary City Institute and teaches at Harvard University’s Graduate School of Design with Jacques Herzog and Pierre de Meuron. From 2015 to 2020 he was professor of urban and territorial design at the University of Basel. Herz has published extensively on issues of diaspora and architecture. Currently, he is researching planning strategies of refugee camps and the dilemma of humanitarian action."

He presented an academic paper at the Holcim Forum for Sustainable Construction 2007, organized by the Holcim Foundation for Sustainable Construction.

Projects
Babyn Yar Synagogue (2021)
Maternity and Paediatric Hospital in Tambacounda, Senegal (2021)
Ballet Mécanique, Housing in Zürich, Switzerland (2018)
Housing and Creche Lyon, France (2013–15)
Synagogue and Jewish Community Center, Mainz, Germany (2010)
Wohn- und Geschäftshaus Cologne, Germany (2003)

Select bibliography
Herz, Manuel, Institutionalized Experiment: The Politics of "Jewish Architecture" in Germany, Jewish Social Studies – Volume 11, Number 3, Spring/Summer 2005 (New Series), pp. 58–66
Herz, Manuel, Making sense of Darfur
Herz, Manuel with Herzog, Jacques and de Meuron, Pierre: MetroBasel  – The Model of a European Metropolitan Region (2009)
Herz, Manuel, From Camp to City – Refugee Camps of the Western Sahara, Lars Müller Publishers (2012)
Herz, Manuel and Rahbaran, Shadi: Nairobi: Migration Shaping the City, Lars Müller Publishers (2013)
Herz, Manuel: African Modernism – The Architecture of Independence, Park Books (2015) // award: FILAF D'OR 2015

References

21st-century German architects
German architecture writers
Architectural theoreticians
Harvard University faculty
Living people
Year of birth missing (living people)